William Crea J. McKenna (5 October 1889 – 18 April 1958), also known as Billy McKenna, was a Scottish amateur footballer who played as a goalkeeper in the Scottish League for Queen's Park, Falkirk, Port Glasgow Athletic, Morton and Clydebank. He later served on the Queen's Park committee and as club president.

Personal life 
McKenna was married with two daughters. He served in the Lanarkshire Yeomanry in India during the First World War, initially as an enlisted man, prior to being commissioned as a second lieutenant in May 1917. Late in the war, he transferred to the Queen Victoria's Own Madras Sappers & Miners. After the war, McKenna worked in the family tailoring business and later served in the Home Guard during the Second World War.

Career statistics

References 

1889 births
Scottish footballers
Scottish Football League players
British Army personnel of World War I
Association football goalkeepers
Queen's Park F.C. players
Lanarkshire Yeomanry officers
Indian Army personnel of World War I
British Indian Army officers
Falkirk F.C. players
Port Glasgow Athletic F.C. players
Greenock Morton F.C. players
1958 deaths
Queen's Park F.C. non-playing staff
Footballers from Glasgow
British tailors
Clydebank F.C. (1914) players
People from Gorbals